The Great Van Robbery is a low budget 1959 British crime film.

Plot
Scotland Yard teams up with Interpol to discover the origins of stolen money in a private bank account in Rio de Janeiro. Assigning their best detective Caesar Smith to the case, the money is soon traced to a robbery from a Royal Mint van. Investigations lead to a coffee storehouse where a worker is found murdered and the remaining loot discovered.

Cast

Notes
The Britmovie website has referred to it as a "routine British crime thriller from second-feature specialists the Danziger Brothers. Denis Shaw convincingly plays Interpol detective Caesar Smith and belies his hefty build to display a nifty line in judo and self-defence."

The camera operator on the film was the future film director Nicolas Roeg.

References

External links

1959 films
British crime films
1950s English-language films
1950s British films